Rafiu Adio Oluwa (1 January 1931 – 27 August 2009) was a Nigerian sprinter. He competed in the men's 200 metres at the 1952 Summer Olympics. He was interred at Ikoyi Cemetery.

References

1931 births
2009 deaths
Athletes (track and field) at the 1952 Summer Olympics
Athletes (track and field) at the 1956 Summer Olympics
Nigerian male sprinters
Nigerian male long jumpers
Olympic athletes of Nigeria
Place of birth missing